Guo Liang (born 24 December 1998) is a Chinese racing cyclist, who last rode for UCI Continental team . He won the scratch event at the 2018 Asian Cycling Championships and the gold medal in the team pursuit at the 2018 Asian Games, with Qin Chenlu, Xue Chaohua and Shen Pingan. He also competed at the 2019 and 2020 UCI Track Cycling World Championships.

Major results
2018
 1st  Scratch, Asian Track Championships
 1st  Team pursuit, Asian Games
2019
 1st  Scratch, 2018–19 UCI Track Cycling World Cup, Hong Kong
 2nd  Madison, Asian Track Championships

References

External links

1998 births
Living people
Chinese male cyclists
Cyclists at the 2018 Asian Games
Medalists at the 2018 Asian Games
Asian Games gold medalists for China
Asian Games medalists in cycling
21st-century Chinese people